State and Prospect District is a national historic district located at Indianapolis, Indiana.  The district encompasses eight contributing buildings and one contributing object in the Fountain Square Commercial Areas of Indianapolis. It developed between about 1871 and 1932, and notable buildings include the Mitschrich / Schaefer Feed Store (c. 1890), Sommer / Roempke Bakery (1875, 1908), and Lorber's Saloon (1885).

It was listed on the National Register of Historic Places in 1983.

References

Historic districts on the National Register of Historic Places in Indiana
Commercial buildings on the National Register of Historic Places in Indiana
Historic districts in Indianapolis
National Register of Historic Places in Indianapolis
Fountain Square, Indianapolis